The 48th Brigade was a brigade of the British Army.

World War I
During World War I, the 48th Brigade was part of the New Army also known as Kitchener's Army. It was assigned to the 16th (Irish) Division and served on the Western Front.  Units during World War I included: 
7th Battalion, Royal Irish Rifles
9th Battalion, Royal Munster Fusiliers
8th Battalion, Royal Dublin Fusiliers
9th Battalion, Royal Dublin Fusiliers
1st Battalion, Royal Munster Fusiliers
2nd Battalion, Royal Dublin Fusiliers
1st Battalion,  Royal Dublin Fusiliers
2nd Battalion, Royal Munster Fusiliers
22nd Battalion, Northumberland Fusiliers
18th Battalion, Cameronians (Scottish Rifles)
11th Battalion, Royal Irish Fusiliers
5th Battalion, Royal Irish Fusiliers
10th Battalion, Royal Dublin Fusiliers
48th Machine Gun Company
48th Trench Mortar Battery

The infantry battalions did not all serve at once, but all were assigned to the brigade during the war.

Post-war
48th Gurkha Infantry Brigade was formed in December 1949 by the redesignation of Johore Sub-District in Penang, Malaya. It was assigned in September 1952 to the new 17th Gurkha Division. By April 1957 it was part of the garrison in Hong Kong (British Forces Overseas Hong Kong). It was redesignated in December 1976 as the Gurkha Field Force. It was again redesignated in 1987 as the 48th Gurkha Infantry Brigade. It was disbanded in the early 1990s.

References

Infantry brigades of the British Army in World War I
Military units and formations established in the 1910s
Military units and formations disestablished in the 1990s